Cold Cave is the moniker for the music of Wesley Eisold, described as a "collage of darkwave, noise, and synthpop." A number of reviewers note the affinity with early 1980s post-punk and early synthpop, in particular Joy Division and New Order.

History

Formation
Cold Cave was founded in 2007 by Wesley Eisold, former vocalist of hardcore groups Give Up the Ghost (previously known as American Nightmare), Some Girls. and Heartworm Press founder. Cold Cave represents Eisold's first venture into instrumentation. Eisold was born with one hand which led him to electronic music.

Love Comes Close (2007–2010)

After initial releases on Dais Records, Hospital Productions, What's Your Rupture?, and Eisold's own Heartworm Press, he signed to Matador Records, who re-released his self-released debut album, Love Comes Close, on November 3, 2009.

Cherish the Light Years (2011–2012)
In April 2011 Matador Records released his second album, Cherish the Light Years.

In July 2011, Cold Cave remixed "I Didn't See It Coming" by the band Belle and Sebastian. The song appeared on their 12-inch single "Come On Sister" released by Matador Records and Rough Trade Records.

In April 2012, Cold Cave performed at the Solomon R. Guggenheim Museum between John Chamberlain sculptures as part of the museum's Divine Ricochet series.

In October 2012, Cold Cave performed at the Getty Center.

Singles series and Full Cold Moon (2012–present)
In September 2012, Eisold announced Cold Cave would be touring the US later in the year, he would be recording a new album, and that the new live lineup included: Hunter Burgan (AFI), London May (Samhain), Jessie Nelson, and Cody Votolato (The Blood Brothers). This lineup was exclusive to this two-and-a-half-week tour and Eisold said performing with a full band was something that failed to materialize during Cherish the Light Years tours. While continuing to work on a follow-up to Cherish the Light Years and not under contract with a label, Eisold began independently releasing a series of stand-alone singles. Eisold wrote and recorded these new songs by himself similar to how songs on Cremations and Love Comes Close were crafted. He said they were created "by myself, at a desk in my apartment. It was freeing and exciting in a way because I didn't owe anyone an album. I got to just make them to make them. The songs were minimal, honest, electronic and without help."

The first single in the series was "A Little Death to Laugh." The single was released in October 2012 through Heartworm and a music video for the song was released in March 2013. In 2013, Eisold released "Oceans with No End" (through Jacob Bannon's Deathwish Inc.), "God Made the World" and "Black Boots", for which  Slava Tsukerman, known for his 1982 film Liquid Sky, directed a music video.  In October 2013, Cold Cave released a digital-only, fifth stand-alone single titled "Nausea, The Earth and Me."

On February 21, 2013, Eisold announced that Justin Benoit, a former live contributor to Cold Cave, had died.

In support of the new singles, Cold Cave embarked on an extensive tour of Asia, performing in Japan, South Korea, China, Thailand, Nepal, and Hong Kong in April 2013; performed live with industrial/noise pioneer Boyd Rice in mid-2013; toured with synthpop artist Gary Numan in September 2013; and toured with Nitzer Ebb frontman Douglas McCarthy in October 2013. In January 2014, Cold Cave remixed the song "Running" by Nine Inch Nails as part of a remix EP Seed Eight, to coincide with the launch of Beats Music. In May 2014, Cold Cave opened for Nine Inch Nails on their full European and UK tour. They were also invited to open for Nine Inch Nails and Soundgarden on their North American tour, after Death Grips, the band originally chosen for opening, decided to split.

Cold Cave began working on its third studio album and follow up to Cherish the Light Years tentatively titled Sunflower in 2013, and a release date in 2014 was originally anticipated. On what the potential sonic direction of the new album, Eisold said it would be a "mix between some of the bigger sounds on Cherish and more minimal stuff I'm interested in now, like Suicide or 39 Clocks." However tours in support of Full Cold Moon and the 2012–2013 singles series proved to be more fruitful than anticipated, and as a result, work on Sunflower was put on hold.

In June 2015, Cold Cave performed at the wedding of Tony Hawk and Catherine Goodman at the Adare Manor in Ireland.

In mid-February 2016, a single called "Nothing Is True But You" was released. In Spring, Max G. Morton, who played keyboards for a short portion of the band's early days and also collaborated with Eisold on prose and publishing via the singer's own Heartworm Press, rejoined the band. At end of August 2016, the band shared another single, an almost cacophonic track called "The Idea of Love". In September, they embarked on a domestic mini-tour together with dark electropop act TR/ST.

In late September 2017, Cold Cave released a single called "Glory", a track reminiscent of early New Order. The video accompanying the track revealed a full live band featuring, besides the ever-present Eisold and Amy Lee, steady touring member Max G. Morton, Nils Bue (bass/guitar) and Ryan McMahon (drums). The band kicked off a small US tour before heading to Europe to support The Jesus and Mary Chain until mid-October.

In early April 2018, the band premiered another song, "You & Me & Infinity", and announced a 26-date North American Spring tour with Choir Boy and Black Marble. At the end of the month, a new EP bearing the title of their latest single was made available digitally. In November of the same year the band headed overseas for a string of selected European dates, again with support from Choir Boy.

Contributors

Cold Cave is essentially a solo project by former Give Up the Ghost and Some Girls frontman Wesley Eisold. While there have been other people contributing to Cold Cave either on tour or in the studio since its conception, Eisold doesn't consider any of them to be official band members. On the subject of band members, Eisold said in an interview, "I struggle with the word 'member' because there are no 'members' of Cold Cave. It's just me. I've collaborated with many people. Some were extremely worthwhile and others were extremely worthless, and I've come to the point where I'm more comfortable doing things by myself."

List of contributors

Discography 
Studio Albums
 Love Comes Close (2009, Heartworm)
 Cherish the Light Years (2011, Matador)

Compilations
 Cremations (2009, Hospital)
 Full Cold Moon (2014, Heartworm)

EPs
 Coma Potion (2008, Heartworm)
 Painted Nails (2008, Hospital)
 Electronic Dreams (2009, Heartworm)
 Easel and Ruby (2009, What's Your Rupture?)
 The Laurels (2009, Big Love Records)
 Death Comes Close (2009, Matador)
 Stars Explode (split with Prurient) (2010, Hospital)
 Life Magazine Remixes (2010, Matador)
 New Morale Leadership (2010, Hospital)
 Rebellion Is Over (collaboration with Genesis P-Orridge and Black Rain) (2015, Heartworm Press/Dais Records)
 You & Me & Infinity (2018, Heartworm Press)
 Fate in Seven Lessons (2021, Heartworm)

Singles

Music Videos

References

External links

 
 Cold Cave on Matador Records

Synthwave musicians
American dark wave musical groups
American gothic rock groups
Electronic music groups from California
Matador Records artists
Musical groups established in 2007
Musical groups from Los Angeles
Noise musical groups
American synth-pop groups
Deathwish Inc. artists
Dais Records artists